, is a national university at Sendai, Miyagi, Japan. The predecessor of the school was founded in 1873, and it was chartered as a university in 1965. It is accredited by the Japanese Ministry of Education (MEXT) as a public co-educational institute and is ranked in Japan's first tier of leading schools.

With four academic divisions, MUE offers degrees in Education and in the disciplines of Language and Social Science, Science, Math and Life, and Art and Physical Education. Their Development and Education division covers Pre-School, Children and Culture, Pedagogy, and Educational Psychology. There are academic tracks for Elementary, Secondary, and Special Needs Education.

Many graduates become principals at schools throughout Japan.

Notable alumni 
Hirohiko Araki, manga artist
Kazusa Okuyama, actress

References

External links
YouTube Channel https://www.youtube.com/user/MUEchannel
University Bulletin https://archive.today/20121129185204/http://157.1.40.181/vol_issue/nels/AA1125110X/ISS0000463717_en.html
Scientific Publications https://web.archive.org/web/20110810225625/http://79.125.109.44/expert/japan/miyagi-university-of-education-27796.html

Educational institutions established in 1873
Japanese national universities
Teachers colleges in Japan
Universities and colleges in Miyagi Prefecture
Buildings and structures in Sendai
1873 establishments in Japan